Ivanović or Ivanovich (Russian: Иванович and Ukrainian: Іванович; also transliterated as Ivanovitch) is a surname, a patronymic derived from Ivan. It is a common surname in Bosnia and Herzegovina, Croatia, Montenegro, and Serbia. It may refer to:

Ana Ivanovic (born 1987), Serbian tennis player
 Andrei Ivanovitch (born 1968), Roumanian pianist
 Cristoforo Ivanovich (1620–1689), music historian, poet, librettist
 Božidar Ivanović (born 1946), Montenegrin chess grandmaster and politician
Božina Ivanović (1931–2002), Montenegrin anthropologist and politician
Branislav Ivanović (born 1984), Serbian footballer
Cristoforo Ivanovich (1620–1689), Venetian music historian, poet, librettist
Dmitry Ivanovich (disambiguation), several people
Đorđe Ivanović (born 1995), Serbian footballer
Duško Ivanović, (born 1957), Montenegrin basketball player and coach
Feodor I of Russia commonly known in Russian as Tsar Fyodor Ivanovich or, in Byzantine tradition, Tsar Feodor Ioannovich
Ivan Rikard Ivanović (born Ivan Kraus; 1880–1949), Croatian politician
Ivan Ivanovich, several uses based on its being the Russian equivalent of 'John Doe'
Ivan Ivanovitch (fencer), French Olympic fencer
Josef Ivanović (born 1973), former German football player and coach
Marin Ivanović (born 1981), Croatian rapper better known by his stage name Stoka
Mihailo Ivanović (disambiguation), several people
Milan Ivanović (born 1960), Serbian-born Australian footballer
Nemanja Ivanović (born 1997), Serbian footballer
Oliver Ivanović (1953–2018), Kosovo Serb politician
Saša Ivanović (born 1984), Montenegrin footballer
Tina Ivanović, (born 1974), Serbian singer and model
Vane Ivanović (1913–1999), Yugoslav diplomat, athlete and philanthropist
Vasily Ivanovich (disambiguation), several people
Velimir Ivanović (born 1978), Serbian footballer

See also
Ivanić
Ivančić
Ivanković
Ivančević
Ivanovski

References

Patronymic surnames
Croatian surnames
Montenegrin surnames
Serbian surnames
Surnames from given names